The first season of Latin American Idol premiered on Sony Entertainment Television on July 12, 2006 and continued until October 27, 2006, when it was won by Venezuelan born Mayré Martínez. Auditions were held in Caracas, Bogotá, Mexico City, and Buenos Aires in the spring of 2006.  The concerts started on August 30 in Buenos Aires, Argentina, the host country.

Concerts

 First Concert: Was held on August 30, 2006. The theme of the show was "My Favorite Pop Idol". It featured clips of the contestants' make over.
 Second Concert: Was held on September 6, 2006. The theme of the show was "The 80's". It featured clips of the contestants' visit to a spa.
 Third Concert: Was held on September 13, 2006. The theme of the show was "Spanish-American Singers". It featured clips of the contestants in a recording studio.
 Fourth Concert: Was held on September 20, 2006. The theme of the show was "Songs By Franco De Vita", who was also a guest judge. It featured clips of the contestants visiting the Hard Rock Café in Buenos Aires. On results' day, before the bottom three were announced, the seven contestants performed "Si La Ves" with Franco De Vita.
 Fifth Concert: Was held on September 27, 2006.  The theme of the show was "Tribute To Women". It featured clips of the contestants at Franco De Vita's concert at the Opera Theater in Buenos Aires.
 Sixth Concert: Was held on October 4, 2006. The theme of the show was "Latin Rhythms". It featured clips of the contestants in a Ricardo Arjona concert, and also clips of them visiting Parque de la Costa, a theme park. They sang two songs for the show.
 Seventh Concert:. Was held on October 11, 2006. The theme of the show was "Rock In Spanish". It featured clips of the contestants signing autographs, sunbathing on a boat and receiving the visit of their close relatives. As music and judge guest was the group Plastilina Mosh from Mexico.
 Eighth Concert: Was held on October 18, 2006. The theme of the show was "Top 40 Popular Songs". It featured clips of the contestants during a photoshoot, and a relaxing day, where they were asked what they'd do first, should they win the competition.
 Final: Was held on October 25, 2006.  The two final contestants sang three songs for the show: their favourite song, selected from the ones they had sung throughout the contest, and two songs specially composed for the show.  One of the new songs was composed by Jon Secada, and the other one by Obie Bermúdez and Sebastián Chris.  Each contestant performed both songs.  The results' show lasted one and a half hours and featured the performances of several well-known Latin American groups and singers: Estéfano, Los Amigos Invisibles, Fonseca and finally Sin Bandera. Mayré Martinez was crowned as the first Latin American Idol.

Finalists

Bottom three statistics

Semi-finals

First Workshop
Held on August 2, 2006. The semi-finalists eliminated from the competition were:

Second Workshop
Held on August 9, 2006. It had a musical guest appearance by Julieta Venegas. The semi-finalists eliminated from the competition were:

Third Workshop
Held on August 16, 2006. The semi-finalists eliminated from the competition were:

Wild Card Workshop

There were six people out of the three semi-final groups that had a second chance to become the tenth and last finalist, on a workshop that was held on August 23, 2006.

External links
 Official website

Latin American Idol
2006 television seasons
2006 in Latin music

es:Latin American Idol (Primera Temporada)
nl:Latin American Idol